End of empire is a phrase that may refer to:
 The final phase in the decline of an imperial power, such as the British or Byzantine empires.
 Decolonization
 Abolition of monarchy
 List of extinct states
 Empire's End, a book from the fictional Star Wars franchise
 End of Empire, 14 part 1985 Granada Television series written and produced by Brian Lapping and Norma Percy
 End of Empire, a boardgame simulation of the French and Indian War and the American Revolution, originally published in Command Magazine #46 (1997) and republished by Compass Games (2014)